Riverhead is an original motion picture soundtrack album by Norwegian experimental collective Ulver for Justin Oakey’s 2016 film of the same name. The album was issued in December 2016 via House of Mythology.

The music was composed by Ulver, this time consisting of Ole-Henrik Moe, Kristoffer Rygg, Kari Rønnekleiv,  Jørn H. Sværen, and Tore Ylwizaker and recorded, edited, and mixed by Kristoffer Rygg and Tore Ylwizaker at Oak Hill studios, Oslo, between June–July 2016. The final recordings were mastered by Jaime Gomez Arellano at Orgone, London, in September 2016. The soundtrack has been described as “sparse and minimal as ever, but with a gentle drive to its arc.”

Background
Justin Oakey is a filmmaker from Newfoundland who had previously collaborated with Ulver.

Writing about the soundtrack, Oakey says:

Critical reception

Alex Lynham, writing for Prog magazine, says “their electronic and ambient influences shine strongly, and lend themselves well to the cinematic atmosphere, but perhaps less obviously where there are organic instruments there remains a strong folk influence.” Lynham concludes, “As a soundtrack album, it’s entirely possible that only hardcore fans of Ulver will find it essential; however, for those interested in the band beyond their early mercurial folk and black metal records, this is an interesting and captivating document of their electronic and cinematic work.”

The Wire magazine’s review in their February 2017 issue explains, “The film deals with poisonous rivalry existing between two hierarchical neighbours over family and religion. It’s bleak and minimalist in its telling, and Ulver’s score accompanies the mood of the story perfectly, with sawing strings and frozen musical passages giving a sense of immediate danger as the plot unravels. Also impressive is the way the music entwines round the film’s snowy landscape, soughing through the trees like an ill wind to add an extra chill to the proceedings.”

Track listing

Personnel 
Ulver
Kristoffer Rygg – synth Pads, pedalboard, percussion 
Jørn H. Sværen – wind
Tore Ylwizaker – keyboards, electronics

Additional musicians
Ole-Henrik Moe – hardingfele, fiddle, violin, viola, cello
Kari Rønnekleiv – hardingfele, violin

Production and design
+ wolframgrafik – design, layout
KR – lacquer cut
Justin Oakey – sleeve notes (L'Anse Aux Meadows, September 2016)
Jaime Gomez Arellano – mastering
 Kristoffer Rygg- recording, editing, mixing
 Tore Ylwizaker – recording, editing, mixing

References

External links
 

2016 soundtrack albums
Drama film soundtracks
Riverhead